23S rRNA (uracil1939-C5)-methyltransferase (RumA, RNA uridine methyltransferase A, YgcA) is an enzyme with systematic name S-adenosyl-L-methionine:23S rRNA (uracil1939-C5)-methyltransferase. This enzyme catalyses the following chemical reaction

 S-adenosyl-L-methionine + uracil1939 in 23S rRNA  S-adenosyl-L-homocysteine + 5-methyluracil1939 in 23S rRNA

The enzyme specifically methylates uracil1939 at C5 in 23S rRNA.

References

External links 
 

EC 2.1.1